Robert John Parker, Baron Parker of Waddington, PC (25 February 1857 – 12 July 1918) was a British judge who served as Lord of Appeal in Ordinary. He has been described as "one of the most esteemed judges of the early twentieth century."

Early life and career 
Born at Claxby Rectory, Alford, Lincolnshire, Parker was the son of the Reverend Richard Parker and of Elizabeth Coffin. His sister was the mental health worker Dame Ellen Pinsent. He was educated at Westminster School, Eton College (where he was a King's Scholar and Newcastle medallist), and King's College, Cambridge. At Cambridge he won the Browne Medal for Greek ode, and in 1880 was bracketed fifth in the first class of the classical tripos.

After taking his degree in 1880, Parker entered at Lincoln's Inn as a student and read in the chambers of Matthew Ingle Joyce. He was called to the bar in 1883 and remained in Ingle Joyce's chambers. In 1900, Ingle Joyce was appointed to the High Court, and Parker was selected by Lord Finlay to succeed Ingle Joyce as junior equity counsel to the Treasury, although he was unknown to the public. He never took silk.

Judicial career 
Parker was appointed a justice of the High Court in 1906, receiving the customary knighthood. Assigned to the Chancery Division, he rapidly acquired a judicial reputation, and sometimes sat as an additional judge of the Court of Appeal. He was especially known for his trial of patent cases, and settled the practice under the Patents and Designs Act 1907. After delivering a judgement on the Marconi wireless telegraphy patents in 1913, he was invited to chair a technical advisory committee on wireless telegraphy, appointed to help the Postmaster-General to choose a system for the Imperial Wireless Chain. On 1 May 1913 the committee reported in favour of Marconi's system.

On 4 March 1913, Parker was chosen to succeed to Lord Macnaghten as Lord of Appeal in Ordinary, an unusually fast progress from the junior bar. He was created a life peer, taking the title of Baron Parker of Waddington, of Waddington in the County of York, and was sworn of the Privy Council on 7 March.

As an appellate judge, Parker had a high reputation, and was much concerned with the reputation and independence of the court. On one occasion, a politically fraught case came to the law lords, who divided 4 to 3 along party lines. Parker, who was in the minority, proposed to a judge in the majority that they should deliver each other's judgments, an offer which was refused. During the First World War, he sat on appeals from prize courts in the Judicial Committee of the Privy Council, and rapidly mastered the intricate practice in prize cases, without any previous experience in the field.

Parker also took part in public affairs. At the outbreak of the First World War, Parker lobbied privately ministers to introduce price controls, without success. He also spoke in the Lords, sometimes pressed by his friend Lord Curzon. In 1915, he spoke to the House of Lords about post-war reconstruction, and during the passage of the Representation of the People Act 1918 Parker (who had deputy high steward of the University of Cambridge since 1915) successfully pressed the Lords to allow women to vote in university constituencies even though they were disbarred from taking their degrees. On 19 March 1918, shortly before his death, Parker spoke on a motion by Lord Parmoor in favour of a League of Nations. Unable to read his handwriting due to failing light, Parker went to the table and read out a detailed scheme of twenty articles for the League's organisation.

His health failing, Parker carried on working until the summer of 1918, before passing away on 12 July at Aldworth House, near Lurgashall, Sussex, the former residence of Lord Tennyson.

Family 

On 9 September 1884 he married Constance Barkley, the daughter of a civil engineer; they had three sons and two daughters. One of his sons, Hubert Parker, Baron Parker of Waddington was Lord Chief Justice of England from 1958 to 1971, taking the same title as his father. A grandson, Sir Roger Parker, was a Lord Justice of Appeal.

The ancient Parker family seat is Browsholme Hall in the Forest of Bowland. Traditionally, the Parkers have served as Bowbearers to the Lords of Bowland.

Selected judgments

High Court 

 Johnson v Clark [1908] 1 Ch 303
 Lord Fitzhardinge v. Purcell [1908] 2 Ch 139
 Jones v Pritchard [1908] 1 Ch 630
 Manks v Whiteley [1911] 2 Ch 448

House of Lords and Privy Council 

 Barry v Minturn [1913] AC 584
 Attorney-General of the Commonwealth v. Adelaide Steamship Co [1913] AC 781
 Kreglinger v New Patagonia Meat and Cold Storage Co Ltd [1914] AC 25
 Trim Joint District School Board of Management v Kelly [1914] AC 667
 Stickney v. Keeble [1915] AC 386
Pwllbach Colliery Co Ltd v Woodman [1915] AC 634
 The Roumanian [1916] 1 AC 124
 The Zamora [1916] 2 AC 77
 Tamplin Steamship Co Ltd v Anglo Mexican Petroleum Co [1916] 2 AC 397
 Daimler Co Ltd v Continental Tyre & Rubber Co (Great Britain) Ltd [1916] 2 AC 307
 Admiralty Commissioners v SS Amerika [1917] AC 38
 Bowman v Secular Society Ltd [1917] AC 406
Cotman v Brougham [1918] AC 514
 Banbury v Bank of Montreal [1918] AC 626

References

External links

1857 births
1918 deaths
People educated at Eton College
People educated at Westminster School, London
Alumni of King's College, Cambridge
Parker of Waddington 
Members of the Privy Council of the United Kingdom
People from Alford, Lincolnshire
Members of the Judicial Committee of the Privy Council
Chancery Division judges
Knights Bachelor
Barons created by George V